Nie Er (14 February 1912 – 17 July 1935), born Nie Shouxin, courtesy name Ziyi (子義 or 子藝), was a Chinese composer best known for "March of the Volunteers", the national anthem of People's Republic of China.  In numerous Shanghai magazines, he went by the English name George Njal, after a character in Njal's Saga.

Biography
Nie Er's ancestors were from Yuxi, Yunnan, in southwest China. He was born in Kunming, Yunnan. From an early age he displayed an interest in music. From 1918 he studied at the Kunming Normal School's Affiliated Primary School. In 1922 he entered the Private Qiushi Primary School (Senior Section), and in 1925 entered Yunnan Provincial Number One Combined Middle School.

In 1927, Nie Er graduated from Yunnan Provincial Number One Combined Middle School, and entered Yunnan Provincial Number One Normal School. At school, he participated in the book club, and organised the Nine-Nine Music Society, which performed within the school and outside. During this time, he learnt to play the violin and piano.

In June 1931, Nie Er entered the Mingyue Musical Drama Society as a violinist. In July 1932 he published A Short Treatise on Chinese Song and Dance, in which he criticised the Drama Society's president, Li Jinhui, as a result of which he was forced to leave the society. Prior to joining the Lianhua Film Studio in November 1932, he took part in shaping the Bright Moonlight Song and Dance Troupe.  He later joined the musical group of the Friends of the Soviet Union Society. He also organized the Chinese Contemporary Music Research Group, which participated in the Leftist Dramatist's Union. In 1933, he joined the Communist Party of China.

In 1933, he impersonated a Black miner in the film The Light of Maternal Instinct.
In April 1934, Nie Er joined Pathé Records and managed the musical section. In the same year he founded the Pathé National Orchestra. This was a prolific year for him in terms of musical output. In January 1935 he became the director of the musical department of Lianhua Number Two Studio.

In April 1935,  Nie Er went to Japan to meet his elder brother in Tokyo. There, he composed the "March of the Volunteers", which would later become the national anthem of China.

Name
When Shouxin was young he showed signs of musical talent. He was able to imitate the voices of people he knew, and almost any sound that entered his ears. He could learn any song just by listening to it twice. Thus, people began to call him "Ears" (耳).

In addition to having musically trained ears, Shouxin was able to move each of his ears independently. This earned him another nickname, "Doctor Ears". Shouxin felt that his nickname is interesting and said that "Since friends give me one more ears, I will have one more ears from now on". Later on, he changed his name to be Nie Er (聂耳).

Death
On July 17, 1935, he died while swimming in Fujisawa, Kanagawa, Japan, at the age of twenty-three. He may have been en route to the Soviet Union, passing through Japan to receive training, sent by the Chinese Communist Party. Some suspect that he was killed by the Japanese, while others believe that he was killed by Chinese Nationalists, as he was in Japan to flee from them. However, because he disappeared while swimming with friends, this made the possibility of assassination difficult and highly unlikely. Evidence points to drowning as the most probable cause of death. He was found by the local rescue team the following day. According to the rescue team and the police, his body was not different from that of ordinary drowned bodies.

Compositions

Nie Er wrote a total of 37 pieces in his life, all in the three years before his death. A significant proportion of these songs reflected working class life and struggles. He often collaborated with lyricist Tian Han.

Apart from "March of the Volunteers", his other important works include:
1932:
"March" (进行曲)
"Waltz" (圆舞曲)
"Love of Family Union" (天伦之爱)
1933:
"Miners' Song" (开矿歌)
"Song of Hunger and Cold Suffering" (饥寒交迫之歌)
"Song of Newsboy" (卖报歌)
 1934:

"Out of Studio" (走出摄影场)
"A Female Star" (一个女明星)
"Snow Flying" (雪飞花)
"Spring Dawn on the Green Lake" (翠湖春晓), instrumental piece
"Snowflakes Flutter" (雪花飞)
"Dance of the Golden Snake" (金蛇狂舞), arranged from the last fast section of the Jiangnan sizhu piece "Yang Ba Qu" 阳八曲 (Yáng Bā Qǔ, "Yang Eight Tune"), also called Fan Wang Gong 梵王宫 (Fàn Wáng Gōng, "Fa as Mi") or 梵皇宫 (Fàn Huáng Gōng)
"Zhaojun He Fan" (昭君和番)
"Little Wild Cat" (小野猫)
"Song of Making Bricks" (打砖歌)
"Dock Workers' Song" (码头工人歌)
"Song of Labor Force" (苦力歌)
"Graduation Song" (毕业歌)
"Song of the Broad Road" (大路歌)
"Pioneers" (开路先锋)
"Song of Whirling Flowers" (飞花歌)
1935:
"Leaving Southeast Asia" (告别南洋)
"Spring is Coming Back" (春回来了)
"Song of Comfort" (慰劳歌)
"Song of Mei Niang" (梅娘曲)
"Tone of Fugitive" (逃亡曲)
"Village Girl of the Steppes" (塞外村女)
"Hit the Changjiang River" (打长江)
"Song of Picking Water Chestnuts" (采菱歌)
"Singing Girl Downtrodden" (铁蹄下的歌女)
"Small Worker" (小工人)
"Song of Wounded Soldier" (伤兵歌)
"Progress Song" (前进歌)
"Song of White Snow" (白雪歌)
"Song of Picking Tea" (采茶歌)
"Love Song of Tea Mountain" (茶山情歌)
"New Woman" (新女性)
Storm on the Yangtze (扬子江暴风雨) (an opera)

Legacy
In the history of modern Chinese music, Nie Er has undoubtedly taken a special position. It is not only because his "March of the Volunteers" was later adopted as the present national anthem of the People's Republic of China, but in his short life, he created for the people many other songs and instrumental pieces. Some of his works reflected the sufferings and groaning of the broad mass of the labouring people at that time, and others were an expression of the patriotism and resistance of the Chinese people in face of the Japanese aggression. His works, some full of tremendous momentum and imbued with the spirit of the age, some lyrical, graceful and in a strongly national style, were not only great favourites of Chinese at home and abroad then, but are also still treasured by the Chinese people today as precious elements of the Chinese national music. Although his career as a composer lasted for only two years, from the publishing of his first composition to his accidental death when swimming in the sea of Japan, his works have had a uniquely profound influence on modern Chinese music.

Film
In 1959, on the 10th anniversary of the founding of the People's Republic, China produced a biopic entitled Nie Er, retelling the story of Nie Er and his composition of the Chinese National Anthem.

Nie Er Piano

Nie Er Piano was founded by Zhu Xuegong at Shanghai in 1958. The brand hires German piano construction experts and uses American advanced technology to build its own pianos. The Nie Er brand piano has become one of the most successful piano brands in China.

Nie Er Park

Nie Er Park is located on the northernmost of Yuxi City, it occupied 100,000 square meters, which was completed in July 1987. It is a comprehensive park that can be used for relaxing, entertaining, and promoting culture. The whole park is divided into parts that are for commemoration, entertaining, relaxation, cultural activities, children's play, ornamental flowers, and park administration.
 
Nie Er's statue is the main body of the commemorative part.  The statue is 2.4 meters tall, weighs 1.8 tons, and faces north. The height of the platform under the statue is 2.25 meters. Nie Er's statue leans forward with coat flying, his face is solemn with arms held up and gestures in beating the time. Overall, it looks like he is conducting and singing his "March of Volunteers".

Nie Er Cultural Square

Nie Er Cultural Square is located at Yuxi, Yunnan, which is composed by one lake, two line (outer traffic line & inner lake line), and four areas (recreational area, business area, exercising area & musical square area).

There is a statue of Nie Er playing the violin on the top of the mountain. On the bottom of the statue, there are six words that were written by a former member of the Politburo Standing Committee of the Communist Party of China, Li Lanqing, which are "Nie Er Musical square" (聂耳音乐广场) in Chinese. When you are looking the square from a bird's eye view, the design of the square looks like a big violin that is lying on the earth.

The view is magnificent and beautiful. There are more and more people who would like to come and stop by for a while.

Nie Er Square in Japan

In 1981, Fujisawa, Japan, under the socialist mayor Shun Hayama (葉山峻), and Kunming became sister cities.  Nie Er Square was established in Shonan Beach Park (湘南海岸公園), near the beach where he had died.

Gallery

Quotes 

Zhou Enlai (first premier of China): "Many youngsters were going to the revolution by singing songs of Xian Xinghai and Nie Er. They are the great musicians."
Zhu De (Chinese general): "He is a musician of the people."
Guo Moruo (writer): "Nie Er, the horn of the Chinese revolution, the drum of People's liberation, and his March of the Volunteers have already been regarded as Chinese Anthem. This song always triggers people's patriotism, and it also raises morale with its solemnity. As well as our national flag, Nie Er is immortal."
Xia Yan (playwright): "Though Nie Er only worked for two years in Shanghai, he still wrote tons of well-known music, which are better for promoting anti-Japanese national salvation movement. Many people are going to the war by singing these songs."
Tian Han (playwright): "The reason Nie Er's works are proliferated so fast is due to his enthusiasm on politics. His intention for composing is not for making music, but he is standing among the miserable people to shout out his anger and request. His work tightly combines the revolutionary world view and progressive innovative method together, which is certainly the invincible for art innovation.
Xian Xinghai (composer): "His songs are aggressive, he wants to awaken people by using his songs. His songs are anti-imperialism, anti-feudalism, and anti-warlordism, which are landmark for China. His songs can reflect people's requests, so that can be accepted and sang by millions people. He is the founder of Chinese new music. Many people say that he still need more professional cultivation on musical skills, which is not right. From his hard-working and achievements, I can say that he has already exceeded many so-called "master musician" and " professional composer".  Because of his modesty, he has already surpassed many nominal 'musicians'."
He Lüting (composer): "That Nie Er passed away so young is a big loss for China's musical landscape. However, his contributions to the civil revolution are significant, which are the pride of China's musical landscape. Nie Er is immortalized."

See also
 Musical nationalism
 Ren Guang
 Lü Ji (composer)
 Xian Xinghai

References

External links

 

1912 births
1935 deaths
Accidental deaths in Japan
Chinese male composers
Chinese violinists
Republic of China musicians
People from Kunming
National anthem writers
Deaths by drowning
Musicians from Yunnan
20th-century violinists
Chinese composers
20th-century Chinese musicians
20th-century male musicians